The history of BFC Dynamo began with the founding of sports club SC Dynamo Berlin in 1954. SC Dynamo Berlin entered the 1954-55 DDR-Oberliga after taking over the first team of SG Dynamo Dresden and its place in the league. The relocation was designed to provide the East German capital with a competitive team that could rival the teams from West Berlin. Prominent players in the team were Günter Schröter, Johannes Matzen, and Herbert Schoen. SC Dynamo Berlin captured its first trophy in the 1959 FDGB-Pokal. The team then finished the 1960 DDR-Oberliga as runners-up. However, the team of SC Dynamo Berlin in the 1960s would be relatively weak. It would be overshadowed in the capital by ASK Vorwärts Berlin.

The football department of SC Dynamo Berlin was reorganized as football club BFC Dynamo in 1966. BFC Dynamo was relegated to the second tier DDR-Liga after the 1966-67 DDR-Oberliga. The club then began a process to rejuvenate the team. Harald Schütze and Norbert Johannsen were among the young players that were given the opportunity to make appearances with the first team in the 1967-68 DDR-Liga. Other young players from the youth department that would join the first team over the next seasons were Peter Rohde, Bernd Brillat and Frank Terletzki.  BFC Dynamo finished the 1970-71 FDGB-Pokal as runners-up and thus qualified for its first UEFA competition. The team reached the semi-finals of the 1971-72 European Cup Winners' Cup before losing to Dynamo Moscow in a penalty shoot-out; BFC Dynamo became the first and so far only football club in Berlin to have reached the semi-finals of the most prestigious European club competitions.

The successful 1971–72 season was followed by a decline. However, BFC Dynamo developed a highly successful youth academy in the 1970s. The club gained access to a nationwide scouting network supported by numerous training centres (TZ) of SV Dynamo across East Germany. Young talented players from the youth department were continuously integrated into the first team. BFC Dynamo had the youngest team in the 1975-76 DDR-Oberliga, with an average age of only 22.5 years. BFC Dynamo eventually established itself as one of the top-teams in the DDR-Oberliga from the mid-1970s. Prominent players in the team in the late 1970s were Frank Terletzki, Wolf-Rudiger Netz, Reinhard Lauck, Hans-Jürgen Riediger, Lutz Eigendorf and Norbert Trieloff.

Background: SC Dynamo Berlin (1954–1966)

BFC Dynamo began as a football department of SC Dynamo Berlin. SC Dynamo Berlin was founded as a sports club in East Berlin on 1 October 1954. As all clubs bearing the name Dynamo, it was part of SV Dynamo, the sports association for the security agencies. The president of SV Dynamo was Erich Mielke, at the time Deputy State Secretary of the State Security Service, commonly known as the Stasi. Mielke was a football enthusiast, who saw football as a way of aggrandizing East Germany and socialism.

In order to establish a competitive side in Berlin the first team of SG Dynamo Dresden and its place in the DDR-Oberliga was transferred to the new sports club SC Dynamo Berlin. The team played its first match for SC Dynamo Berlin on 21 November 1954 against BSG Rotation Babelsberg in the 10th matchday of the 1954-55 DDR-Oberliga. Political factors and pressure from Mielke were probably the main reasons behind the relocation. The relocation was designed to provide the capital with a team that could rival Hertha BSC, Blau-Weiß 1890 Berlin and Tennis Borussia Berlin, which were still popular in East Berlin and drew football fans to West Berlin.

Among the players delegated from SG Dynamo Dresden were Johannes Matzen, Herbert Schoen and Günter Schröter. The trio had only a few years earlier been delegated from SV Deutsche Volkspolizei Potsdam to SV Deutsche Volkspolizei Dresden. SV Deutsche Volkspolizei Dresden had been chosen as an ideologically acceptable replacement for the popular SG Friedrichstadt. SG Friedrichsstadt was dissolved by the authorities after the 1949-50 DDR-Oberliga  and its place in the Oberliga was transferred to SV Deutsche Volkspolizei Dresden. SV Deutsche Volkspolizei Dresden soon became a dominant side in East German football and was reformed as SG Dynamo Dresden in 1953. Dresden had two sides in the 1953–54 DDR-Oberliga. Berlin had no representation in the highest competition, which did not please Mielke. Berlin was the capital of the republic and he thought it needed a strong football team to represent it.

SC Dynamo Berlin finished its first season in the DDR-Oberliga in seventh place. Matzen and Karl-Heinz Holze became the best goalscorers for SC Dynamo Berlin in the league. SC Dynamo Berlin was then successful in the transitional 1955 DDR-Oberliga, but suffered relegation to the DDR-Liga after the 1956 DDR-Oberliga. SC Dynamo Berlin immediately secured promotion back to the DDR-Oberliga, but would have difficulty establishing itself in football in Berlin. The team rarely drew crowds larger than 5,000 spectators at the Walter-Ulbricht-Stadion. The team would finally secure its major trophy in the 1959 season. SC Dynamo Berlin reached the final of the 1959 FDGB-Pokal. The team defeated SC Wismut Karl-Marx-Stadt in the two-legged final and won the cup. The first leg ended 0–0, but the second leg was won 3–2, with two goals scored by Christian Hofmann and one penalty goal scored by Günter Schröter. However, the team was not allowed to participate in the 1960–61 European Cup Winners' Cup. The German Football Association of the GDR (DFV) instead found local rival and league runners-up ASK Vorwärts Berlin to be a more suitable representative of East Germany in the competition. The team instead went on a friendly tour to China and North Korea in July 1960.

Günter Schröter was a key player of SC Dynamo Berlin during the 1950s. He was the second best goal scorer in the league in the 1955 and the 1959 DDR-Oberliga. Schröter scored all five goals for SC Dynamo Berlin in the 5–0 victory over SC Lokomotiv Leipzig in the ninth matchday of the 1959 DDR-Oberliga on 10 May 1959. Schröter and Herbert Maschke would still be central players in the team in the early 1960s. But the players of the former SG Dynamo Dresden team had aged by the late 1950s. The team would now instead be shaped by players such Martin Skaba, Werner Heine and Waldemar Mühlbächer. The three were recruited in 1955–1956 and belonged to a new generation of players who did not come from SG Dynamo Dresden. Other central players who had joined the team in the late 1950s were Hermann Bley and Konrad Dorner. The team was then joined by Romanian-born forward Emil Poklitar from BSG Rotation Babelsberg an forward Wilfried Klingbiel from BSG Lokomotive Stendal for the 1960 season. Poklitar immadiately proved to be a very promising goal scorer during the 1960 Oberliga, scoring 14 goals in 19 league matches.

SC Dynamo Berlin had some success in the first seasons of the 1960s. The team finished the 1960 DDR-Oberliga as runner-up. As many as six players from SC Dynamo Berlin were included in the starting line-up of the East Germany national football team in the match against Denmark in front of 45,000 spectators at Idrætsparken on 28 May 1961: Werner Heine, Martin Skaba, Waldemar Mühlbächer, Herbert Maschke and Günther Schröter. SC Dynamo Berlin was a top team also in the also in the 1961-62 DDR-Oberliga. The team stood at second place in the league by the summer-break. SC Dynamo Berlin was then allowed to participate the 1961–62 International Football Cup. The team defeated Wiener SC 3-5  on 18 June 1961, in  its first competitive international match. However, the team's top goalscorer Emil Poklitar and teammate Rolf Starost defected to West Berlin after a friendly match against Boldklubben af 1893 at Idrætsparken in Copenhagen on 13 August 1961. SC Dynamo Berlin nevertheless remained a  top-team in the league and was again on its way to success in the FDGB-Pokal. The team reached the final of the 1961-62 FDGB-Pokal after defeating SC Empor Rostock by a whopping 5-1 in the semi-finals. SC Dynamo Berlin was eventually defeated 3-1 by SC Chemie Halle in the final. The team finished the 1961-62 DDR-Oberliga in third place.

However, SC Dynamo Berlin found itself overshadowed in the capital by the army sponsored ASK Vorwärts Berlin. ASK Vorwärts Berlin had captured the league title in the 1958 and 1960 DDR-Oberliga and would go on to capture several more titles in the coming years. SC Dynamo Berlin had moved its home matches to the Dynamo-Sportforum after the construction of the Berlin Wall in 1961. The average attendance dropped to 3,000 at the Dynamo-Stadion im Sportforum in the 1962–63 season. The team of SC Dynamo Berlin in the 1960s would eventually prove relatively weak. SC Dynamo Berlin had become a lower table side by the end of the 1962–63 Oberliga. After further seasons of poor results, a second relegation to the DDR-Liga would later occur.

A bitter dispute erupted between Dynamo Berlin and SG Dynamo Schwerin in 1965, over the delegation of three players from SG Dynamo Schwerin to SC Dynamo Berlin. The disparity between sports club SC Dynamo Berlin and sports community SG Dynamo Schwerin was significant. The wage bill of officials and players was 315,559 Marks at SC Dynamo Berlin in the 1964–65 season, compared to 19,428 Marks at SG Dynamo Schwerin in the same season. Local SED politicians and local SV Dynamo functionaries in Bezirk Schwerin aspired to transform Schwerin into a major footballing centre. When SC Dynamo Berlin tried to exercise its right as a sports club to draw talented players from SG Dynamo Schwerin, they put up stern resistance. Mielke and SV Dynamo officials were conscious of the mass appeal of football and the role of SC Dynamo Berlin in the reputation of the Stasi. The delegation was eventually cancelled, but the dispute caused antipathy between the two Dynamo clubs.

East German football was reorganised in 1965–1966 when the football departments were made independent from their sports clubs. Ten football departments  were reorganized into ten designated football clubs. The ten football clubs formed the elite of East German football. They were meant to provide stability to the game at the top level and to supply the national team with talent. Promising players would be ordered to play for them. As part of this reorganization, the football department of SC Dynamo Berlin was separated from the sports club in 1966 and reorganized as football club BFC Dynamo. The football department of sports community SG Dynamo Hohenschönhausen was also disbanded after the 1965–66 season. The players of SG Dynamo Hohenschönhausen joined the reserve team of BFC Dynamo, the BFC Dynamo II, and the place of SG Dynamo Hohenschönhausen in 1966–67 Bezirksliga Berlin was taken over by BFC Dynamo II.

Founding and first seasons (1966–1971)

Founding (1966)
BFC Dynamo was founded on 15 January 1966 as one of the new designated football clubs in East Germany. The new club was presented by the president of SV Dynamo Erich Mielke at a ceremony in front of 1,400 guests in the Dynamo-Sporthalle in Hohenschönhausen in East Berlin. At exactly 19:40, the founding of BFC Dynamo was announced. The last part of the club's founding motto was: "Berliner Fußballclub Dynamo - Our goal: Top achievements - worthy representation of the capital of the GDR ".  The first presidium consisted of the Head of the Volkspolizei in East Berlin Horst Ende, the Intendant of the Metropol theatre Hans Pitra, former DDR-Oberliga player Johannes Matzen and the Editor-in-chief of the East German football weekly Die Neue Fußballwoche (FuWo) (de) Klaus Schlegel. Manfred Kirste was elected club president and Mielke was elected honorary president. Kirste came from Berlin and was a certified sports teacher.

The new football clubs were formed as centers of excellence in East German football and had the right to draw on talents within designated geographical and administrative areas. All football clubs were assigned one or two regional districts as catchment areas at the time of their founding. BFC Dynamo was assigned Bezirk Cottbus and a third of the districts of East Berlin as a catchment area. The club immediately planned to increase the number of youth teams from 14 to 26 at its founding.

However, the backing of a sponsor would also be crucial to the development of a club. BFC Dynamo was officially a club of the Ministry of the Interior. The club's official sponsor was the Volkspolizei. However, the club's honorary chairman Erich Mielke was the head of the Stasi and 96 percent of the sponsoring members of the club would eventuallly be members of the Stasi. BFC Dynamo would come to receive personal, organizational and financial support from the Stasi.

BFC Dynamo was formed from the football department of SC Dynamo Berlin. The former team of SC Dynamo Berlin thus continued as BFC Dynamo.  BFC Dynamo played two friendly matches against Hungarian top teams Budapesti Dózsa SE and Ferencváros in Budapest during the winter break. The team lost the first match 3–1 against Budapesti Dózsa SE on 23 January 1966, but won the second match 2–3 against Ferencváros on 30 January 1966.
 BFC Dynamo played its first competitive match as BFC Dynamo against BSG Motor Zwickau in the 12th matchday of the 1965-66 DDR-Oberliga at the Dynamo-Stadion im Sportforum on 12 February 1966. BFC Dynamo won the match 2–0. Midfielders Waldemar Mühlbächer and Erhard Kochale scored one goal each in the match. BFC Dynamo then defeated SG Dynamo Dresden 3–5 in extra time away in the round of 16 of the 1965-66 FDGB-Pokal at the Rudolf-Harbig-Stadion on 16 February 1966.

The team went on to defeat 1. FC Magdeburg 0–2 away on the 15th matchday on 19 February 1966. Joachim Hall and Michael Jakob scored one goal each in the match. BFC Dynamo then played local rival FC Vorwärts Berlin on the 16th matchday on 26 February 1966 The team lost the derby 0–1 in front of 12,000 spectators at Dynamo-Stadion im Sportforum. The winning goal for FC Vorwärts Berlin was scored by Jürgen Piepenburg. BFC Dynamo was eventually eliminated in the quarter-finals of the 1965-66 FDGB-Pokal after losing 2–1 away to BSG Lokomotive Stendahl on 2 March 1966. The team lost 4–0 away to 1. FC Lokomotive Leipzig in the 19th matchday on 19 March 1966. BFC Dynamo eventually finished 1965-66 DDR-Oberliga in ninth place after a generally weak season. Werner Heine left for 1. FC Union Berlin after the season. Heine had joined SC Dynamo Berlin before the 1955 season.

Relegation and play in the DDR-Liga (1966–1968)

Hungarian Bela Volenik was the new coach for the 1966–67 season. BFC Dynamo recruited goalkeeper Werner Lihsa from SG Dynamo Mansfeld-Kombinat Eisleben for the season. Lihsa became reserve goalkeeper behind Jürgen Bräunlich. Peter Lyszcan was now also a regular player in the team. BFC Dynamo lost 0–3 at home to 1. FC Lokomotive Leipzig in the opening match of the 1966-67 DDR-Oberliga on 6 August 1966. The team got off to a weak start of the league season. The team captured its first win in the league away against FC Carl Zeiss Jena in the 6th matchday on 24 September 1966. The team met 1. FC Union Berlin at home in the 9th matchday on 5 November 1966. The match drew 10,000 spectators at the Dynamo-Stadion im Sportforum. Joachim Ernst scored 0-1 for 1. FC Union Berlin in the 23 minute. Gütner Aedtner equalized in the 68th minute. 1. FC Union Berlin eventually won the match 1-2 after a goal by Günter Hoge in the 76th minute. BFC Dynamo was second to last in the league after the first half of the league season.  The team was then eliminated in the quarter-finals of the 1966-67 FDGB-Pokal, losing 1–2 at home to HFC Chemie on 5 December 1966.

The results in the league saw a slight improvement during second half of the 1966–67 season. The team suffered fewer losses, but the number of matches won was still low. BFC Dynamo had one loss and four draws in the first five matches after the winter break. The team participated in a friendly tournament together with FC Vorwärts Berlin and the Swedish teams AIK and IF Elfsborg during Easter. BFC Dynamo defeated IF Elfsborg 2–1 on 24 March 1967, and then played a 1–1 draw against AIK on 26 March 1967. BFC Dynamo met local rival 1. FC Union Berlin away in the 22nd matchday on 26 April 1967. The team stood at 13th place in the league before the match, two points behind 11th-placed BSG Wismut Aue and 10th-placed BSG Chemie Leipzig. BFC Dynamo still had a chance to retain its place the league. Supporters of 1. FC Union Berlin greeted BFC Dynamo with a banner saying "We greet the relegated". 1. FC Union Berlin won the match 3-0 and the hopes of avoiding relegation were now minimal. The match is seen as the starting point for the feud between the two clubs. 19-year-old forward Peter Lyszcan made his debut for BFC Dynamo in DDR-Oberliga away against HFC Chemie in the 25th matchday on 10 May 1967. The team won the match 1–2, after two goals by Joachim Hall. BFC Dynamo was still in 13th place in the league, two points behind 12th-placed BSG Chemie Leipzig. But the chance to retain the place in the league was only theoretical. The team lost 0–1 at home  to SG Dynamo Dresden in the final matchday on 13 May 1967.  BFC Dynamo finished the 1966-67 DDR-Oberliga in 13th place and was eventually relegated to the DDR-Liga.

Karl Schäffner returned as coach for the 1967–68 season. BFC Dynamo started the 1967-68 DDR-Liga Nord with mixed results. The team had five wins, three losses and two draws after the first ten matchdays. However, BFC Dynamo would eventually come to dominate the league. BFC Dynamo captured the first place in the league in the 13th matchday, after a 1–1 draw away against BSG Chemie Premnitz. The team then defeated SG Dynamo Schwerin 4–0 in the 14th matchday in front of 3,000 spectators at the Dynamo-Stadion im Sportforum on 19 November 1967. Lyszczan scored two goals in the match.  BFC Dynamo would remain in first place for the rest of the league season. BFC Dynamo faced local team SG Lichtenberg 47 away in the 6th matchday on 2 December 1967. The match had previously been postponed. It was now the last match before the winter break. BFC Dynamo lost 1–0 in front of 6,500 spectators at the Hans-Zoschke-Stadion. However, BFC Dynamo still had one point down to scond-placed BSG Energie Cottbus and finished the first half of the season as Herbstmeister.

BFC Dynamo would go through the second half of the league season undefeated. The team met SG Lichtenberg 47 in at home in the 21st matchday. BFC Dynamo won match 1–0 in front of 6,000 spectators at the Dynamo-Stadion im Sportforum. The winning goal was scored by Wilfried Trümpler. The team was set to play the return match against SG Dynamo Schwerin in the 29th matchday. The match was played at the Sportplatz Paulshöhe in Schwerin on 26 May 1967. BFC Dynamo had already secured promotion at this point. The team had eight points down to third-placed BSG Stahl Eisenhüttenstadt and 10 points down to fourth-placed SG Dynamo Schwerin. The match ended with serious riots among the fans of SG Dynamo Schwerin. Emotions between the two clubs had been tense since the dispute over player delegations in 1965. But the decisive factor behind the riots was perceived manipulation of the match by referee Erwin Vetter. BFC Dynamo won the match narrowly by 1–2, after a winning goal by Detlef Weber in the 83rd minute. A Stasi investigation revealed that a sense of injustice was also shared by members of the Stasi in Bezirk Schwerin and that some members of the Stasi who had attended the match either left the ground or followed the events passively. BFC Dynamo finished 1967-68 DDR-Liga Nord in first place and immediately returned to DDR-Oberliga. Lyszczan became shared top goalscorer in the 1967-68 DDR-Liga Nord with 19 goals. Veterans Waldemar Mühlbächer, Martin Skaba and Hermann Bley all retired after the season. Konrad Dorner was transferred to the reserve team and Günter Wolff left for FC Rot-Weiß Erfurt after the season. Mühlbächer, Skaba, Bley and Dorner had all joined SC Dynamo Berlin in 1956–1958.  Wolff was a native of Erfurt and had joined SC Dynamo Berlin as a youth player from BSG Motor Weimar. The departure of Wolff was a loss to the team. The 25-year-old midfielder had played 130 matches for BFC Dynamo and was considered a great talent.

Rejuvenation (1968–1971)
BFC Dynamo aimed to create the basis for something that would last, through long-term planning. This included the formation of a high-performance youth department. BFC Dynamo had won the majority of the youth competitions in East Berlin since the club's founding. The club's youth teams had been particularly successful during the 1966–67 and 1967–68 seasons. A continuous process of rejuvenation had begun after the relegation from the DDR-Oberliga at the end of the 1966–67 season. The club had used the 1967-68 DDR-Liga Nord as an opportunity to integrate a number of young players in the first team. Forwards Harald Schütze and Norbert Johannsen and midfielder Werner Voigt were some of the young players that had been given the opportunity to make a number of appearances with the first team during the 1967–68 season. BFC Dynamo would field a young team in 1968-69 DDR-Oberliga. Harald Schütze was now a regular player in the first team.

BFC Dynamo defeated 1. FC Lokomotive Leipzig 1–0 in the first home match of the 1968-69 DDR-Oberliga in front of 6,000 spectators at the Dynamo-Stadion im Sportforum on 24 August 1968. The winning goal was scored by Harald Schütze. However, this was followed by a 4–1 loss away to 1. FC Magdeburg in the third matchday and a 1–3 loss at home to F.C. Hansa Rostock in the fourth matchday. The young team had a difficult start to the 1968-69 DDR-Oberliga. BFC Dynamo lost 2–0 away to HFC Chemie in the seventh matchday on 28 September 1968. The team was now in 12th place in the league. BFC Dynamo came back with a 3–1 win at home against BSG Stahl Riesa in the following matchday. However, the team was then defeated 4–0 away by then defending champion FC Carl Zeiss Jena in the 9th matchday on 12 October 1968. A few changes was now made to the line-up. A slight turn came in the following matchdays. BFC Dynamo defeated FC Rot-Weiß Erfurt 1–0 in the 10th matchday, drew 1–1 away against rival 1. FC Union Berlin in the 11th matchday and defeated FC Karl-Marx-Stadt 1–0 at home in the 12th matchday. BFC Dynamo finished the first half of the season in the 11th place.

Hans Geitel became the new coach during the winter break. Geitel already had experience from the DDR-Oberliga as former coach of SC Turbine Erfurt. He had previously worked for the youth academy of BFC Dynamo for a number of years. Geitel had been a sucessful coach of the BFC Dynamo junior team. He had led the BFC Dynamo junior team to a victory in the 1966-67 East German Junior Cup (Junge Welt-Pokal) (de), a second place in the 1967-68 East German Junior Cup and then a second place in the 1967-68 East German Junior Championship (de). Geitel would eventually introduce a new tactic that included effective counterplay. BFC Dynamo went on a friendly tour to Africa in January 1969. The team played friendly matches against local teams from Zanzibar and Dar es Salaam for the celebration of the fifth anniversary of the unification of Tanzania. The positive trend in the league continued  in the second half of the 1968-69 DDR-Oberliga. BFC Dynamo defeated BSG Sachsenring Zwickau 1–2 away in the 19th matchday and HFC Chemie 1–0 at home in the 20th matchday. The team was now in eighth place in the league. Then came a difficult setback with a 4–0 loss away to BSG Stahl Riesa in the following matchday. However, BFC Dynamo then managed to defeat third-placed FC Carl Zeiss Jena 2–1 at home in the 22nd matchday on 19 April 1969. Peter Lyszcan and Günter Aedtner scored one goal each in the match. BFC Dynamo reached the semi-finals of the 1968-69 FDGB-Pokal. The team lost the semi-final 1–2 at home to 1. FC Magdeburg on 7 May 1969. BFC Dynamo eventually finished the 1968-69 DDR-Oberliga in 10th place and was able to successfully retain its place in the league. Forward Rainer Gesereich, Erhard Kochale, Michael Jakob and Werner Voigt were transferred to FSG Dynamo Frankfurt after the season.

BFC Dynamo recruited young forward Ralf Schulenberg from FC Rot-Weiß Erfurt for the 1969–70 season. The recruitment of Schulenberg was probably a compensation for the loss of Günter Wolff to FC Rot-Weiß Erfurt after the 1967–68 season. BFC Dynamo defeated SG Dynamo Dresden 3–1 in the fourth matchday of the 1969–70 DDR-Oberliga in front of 8,000 spectators at Dynamo-Stadion im Sportforum on 6 September 1969. Team lost 5–2 away against FC Vorwärts Berlin in the fifth matchday and then 1–4 at home against HFC Chemie in the sixth matchday. BFC Dynamo continued to integrate youth players into the first team. Young midfielder Peter Rohde from the youth department made his debut for BFC Dynamo in the DDR-Oberliga against FC Carl Zeiss Jena in the seventh matchday on 20 September 1969. Rohde would henceforth be a regular player in the team. Also the match against FC Carl Zeiss Jena ended in a loss. The disappointing trend was finally broken with a 3–0 win at home against 1. FC Magdeburg in the eighth matchday on 24 September 1969. BFC Dynamo was in seventh place in the league after the first half of the season. The young midfielder Frank Terletzki from the youth department was given the opportunity to make his first appearance with the first team of BFC Dynamo away against FC Karl-Marx-Stadt in the 15th matchday on 21 March 1970. Terletzki would make several further appearances with the first team in the DDR-Oberliga during the spring. BFC Dynamo won the return match against FC Vorwärts Berlin 1–0 in the 18th matchday in front of 5,000 spectators at the Dynamo-Stadion im Sportforum on 11 April 1970. Rohde scored the winning goal for BFC Dynamo. It was the first victory over local rival FC Vorwärts Berlin since the 1965-66 DDR-Oberliga. The team then played a 0–0 draw at home against F.C. Hansa Rostock in the 22nd matchday on 2 May 1970. 19-year-old defender Bernd Brillat from the youth department made his debut for BFC Dynamo in the DDR-Oberliga  in the match against F.C. Hansa Rostock, as a substitute for Norbert Johannsen. BFC Dynamo finished the 1969-70 DDR-Oberliga in sixth place.

Werner Lihsa was the new first-choice goalkeeper for the 1970–71 season. Norbert Johannsen would also make recurring appearances with the first team during the season. BFC Dynamo started 1970-71 DDR-Oberliga with three consecutive wins. The team then met SG Dynamo Dresden in the fifth matchday on 19 September 1970. SG Dynamo Dresden had now managed to re-established itself as a top team in the DDR-Oberliga. SG Dynamo Dresden, followed by 1. FC Magdeburg, would come to dominate East German football in the 1970s. BFC Dynamo lost the match 0–1 in front of 11,000 spectators at Dynamo-Stadion im Sportforum. Young forward Dietmar Labes from the youth department made his first appearance with the first team in the match against SG Dynamo Dresden, as a substitute for Günter Aedtner. The team then met defending champion FC Carl Zeiss Jena away in the following matchday on 26 September 1970. BFC Dynamo lost the match 5–1, after a hat trick by Peter Ducke. The team came back with a 2-1 win over second-placed 1. FC Magdeburg inte the following match day. Manfred Becker scored both goals for BFC Dynamo in the match. BFC Dynamo was in seventh place in the league after the first half of the season. 

The young defender Bernd Brillat would be used as a regular player during the second half of the season. BFC Dynamo met second-placed FC Carl Zeiss Jena in the 19th matchday on 17 April 1970. The team won the match 2–1 in front of 10,000 spectators at the Dynamo-Stadion im Sportforum. Peter Rohde and Wilfried Trümpler scored one goal each in the match. BFC Dynamo reached the semi-finals of the 1970-71 FDGB-Pokal. The team would once again meet FC Carl Zeiss Jena. BFC Dynamo defeated FC Carl Zeiss Jena 1–0 in the semi-final in front of 8,000 spectators at the Dynamo-Stadion im Sportforum on 13 May 1971. The winning goal was scored by Frank Terletzki on a 25-meter free kick in the 35th minute. BFC Dynamo then defeated 1. FC Lokomotive Leipzig 4–2 at home in the 21st matchday on 25 May 1971. Norbert Johannsen scored two goals for BFC Dynamo in the match. BFC Dynamo eventually finished the 1970-71 DDR-Oberliga in ninth place. BFC Dynamo was then set to play the new East German champion SG Dynamo Dresden in the final of the 1970-71 FDGB-Pokal. The final was played in front of 10,000 spectators at the Kurt-Wabbel-Stadion in Halle on 20 June 1971. Klaus Sammer scored 1-0 for SG Dynamo Dresden in the 65th minute, but Johannsen equalized for BFC Dynamo on a penalty in the 71st minute. SG Dynamo Dresden eventually won the match 2-1 after a second goal by Sammer in the 119th minute. SG Dynamo Dresden thus secured the first double in the history of East German football. However, BFC Dynamo qualified for the 1971-72 European Cup Winners' Cup as runners-up in the 1970-71 FDGB-Pokal, as SG Dynamo Dresden was already qualified for the 1971-72 European Cup as league champions. BFC Dynamo was thus qualified for its first UEFA competition.

Rise (1971–1978)

Focus club in East Berlin and talent factory (1971)
A number of football clubs in East Germany became specially promoted focus clubs in the 1970 DFV Football Resolution. The focus clubs were meant to be strengthened through player transfers. Players in teams that had been relegated from the DDR-Oberliga should also switch to focus clubs. The focus clubs would receive additional financial support from the German Gymnastics and Sports Federation (DTSB) and other advantages.  They would be equipped with more staff as well as better material and technical conditions. FC Vorwärts Berlin and BFC Dynamo became focus clubs in East Berlin.  Additional advantages would then be given to focus club in the 1976 DFV Football Resolution. The focus clubs would then be allowed to delegate youth players from other football clubs. They would also be provided with more youth coaches from the DFV and have the right to delegate twice as many students to their affiliated Children and Youth Sports Schools (KJS) every year, compared to other football clubs.

The football landscape in East Berlin then changed dramatically before of the 1971–72 season. The Ministry of Defence decided to relocate FC Vorwärts Berlin to Frankfurt an der Oder on 31 July 1971. The exact reasons for the decision have not been fully clarified. The relocation was probably the result of political intrigues by the Stasi and the SED. The German author Hans Joachim Teichler writes that all speculation ends up with Erich Mielke. Teichler believes that Mielke must have somehow have convinced the Minister of Defence Heinz Hoffmann that two clubs of the armed organs in East Berlin were one too many. Mielke regarded FC Vorwärts Berlin as a competitor to the BFC Dynamo in the capital, while his colleague in the Politburo and the SED First Secretary in the Bezirk Frankfurt Erich Mückenberger expected a boost for the Frankfurt an der Oder area.

BFC Dynamo and 1. FC Union Berlin were now the only major football clubs in East Berlin. The districts of East Berlin had been divided between BFC Dynamo, FC Vorwärts Berlin and 1. FC Union Berlin when the football clubs were founded. Each club could recruit young talented players from training centers (TZ) in its own districts. The districts were redistributed when FC Vorwärts Berlin was relocated to Frankfurt an der Oder. BFC Dynamo was allowed to take over all districts in East Berlin that had previously belonged to FC Vorwärts Berlin. DTSB officials allegedly saw more potential in BFC Dynamo than in 1. FC Union Berlin. BFC Dynamo now had access to two thirds of all training centers (TZ) in East Berlin. 1. FC Union Berlin also had to hand over its catchment area in Bezirk Potsdam to FC Vorwärts Frankfurt, as compensation for the districts that FC Vorwärts Frankfurt had lost in East Berlin. The relocation of FC Vorwärts Berlin also meant that BFC Dynamo would get the opportunity to play home matches at the larger and more centrally located Friedrich-Ludwig-Jahn-Sportpark in Prenzlauer Berg, which led to increased interest in the club and growing attendance numbers.

BFC Dynamo would eventually be developed into a flagship team of sports association SV Dynamo. The team stood out among other teams within SV Dynamo. BFC Dynamo was located at the frontline of the Cold War. It was also a representative of the East German capital. This meant that the club had to be well equipped. The most influential so-called sponsor association behind SV Dynamo was the Stasi. Supported by Erich Mielke, BFC Dynamo would get the best training facilities, equipment, coaching staff and talent. The team was destined to compete on European level, boosting East German self-confidence and international prestige, and the players were meant to become socialist heroes.

BFC Dynamo would eventually get access to a nationwide scouting network, which included numerous training centers (TZ) of SV Dynamo across East Germany.  The club would get access to a total of 38 training centers (TZ) across East Germany. By comparison, 1. FC Union Berlin only had access to 6 training centers (TZ), all of which were located in the Berlin area. BFC Dynamo would be able recruit young talented players from the youth departments of all sports communities (SG) of SV Dynamo in East Germany, except those in the Bezirk Dresden and a number sports communities in the southern regional districts that belonged to the catchment area of SG Dynamo Dresden. The youth department at BFC Dynamo would eventually be developed into a talent factory under the leadership of Egon Rohde. Egon Rohde had joined the youth department of BFC Dynamo as a youth trainer from SG Dynamo Rostock-Mitte in 1969 and became the head of the extensive youth department of BFC Dynamo. Egon Rohde was also the father of four players in various teams of BFC Dynamo: Peter Rohde, Jürgen Rohde, Rainer Rohde and Frank Rohde.

Success (1971–1972)
BFC Dynamo recruited forward Wolf-Rüdiger Netz from SG Dynamo Schwerin for the 1971–72 season. Norbert Johannsen and Frank Terletzki were now regular players in the first team.  Central players in the team were Harald Schütze, Frank Terletzki, Dieter Stumpf, Norbert Johannsen, Peter Rohde, Wilfried Trümpler, Jochen Carow, Wolf-Rüdiger Netz, Jürgen Hübner and Ralf Schulenberg. BFC Dynamo got a difficult start to the 1971-72 DDR-Oberliga. The team had captured only one win and was in 11th place in the league after the first five matchdays. But the team would have all the more success in Europe. BFC Dynamo was qualified for the 1971-72 European Cup Winners' Cup as runners-up in the 1970-71 FDGB-Pokal. The team eliminated Cardiff City F.C. in the first round and then K Beerschot VA in the second round. The team was thus qualified for the quarter-finals. BFC Dynamo defeated leading FC Carl Zeiss Jena 1–0 in the eighth matchday on 28 November 1971. The winning goal was scored by Norbert Johannsen. The team could thus climb to a seventh place in the league. BFC Dynamo met local rival 1. FC Union Berlin in the 12th matchday in the 1971-72 DDR-Oberliga on 26 December 1971. The match ended in a 1–1 draw in front of 14,000 spectators at the Dynamo-Stadion im Sportforum. The derby was marked by crowd trouble with eight persons arrested. BFC Dynamo was in sixth place in the league before the winter break.

The team would show its potential during the second half of the 1971–72 season. BFC Dynamo defeated BSG Sachsenring Zwickau 0–1 away in the 14th matchday on 8 January 1972. The winning goal was scored by Wolf-Rüdiger Netz. BFC Dynamo now climbed to a fourth place in the league. The team also bypassed rival SG Dynamo Dresden, as SG Dynamo Dresden had lost 1–2 away to 1. FC Magdeburg in the 14th matchday. BFC Dynamo then defeated first-placed 1. FC Magdebug 1–0 in the 15th matchday on 15 January 1972, and climed to a third place. The team then defeated rival SG Dynamo Dresden 2–1 in the 17th matchday on 29 January 1972. Ralf Schulenberg and Norbert Johannsen scored one goal each in the match. The team eventually captured the second place in the league after defeating FC Vorwärts Frankfurt 0–1 away in the 18th matchday on 4 March 1972. Johannsen scored the winning goal for BFC Dynamo. The team had now been undefeated in the first six matchdays of the second half of season. BFC Dynamo defeated Åtvidabergs FF 0–2 away in the first leg of the quarter-finals of the 1971-72 European Cup Winners' Cup on 8 March 1972. Wolf-Rüdiger Netz scored both goals. The team then defeated HFC Chemie 3–8 away in the 19th matchday on 12 March 1972. Norbert Johannsen scored three goals, while Frank Terletzki and Ralf Schulenberg scored two goals each. BFC Dynamo then played a 2–2 draw in that return leg against Åtvidabergs FF in front of 30,000 spectators at a sold out Friedrich-Ludwig-Jahn-Sportpark on 22 March 1972. BFC Dynamo thus qualified for the semi-finals of the 1971-72 European Cup and thereby also became the first team from Berlin to qualify for the semi-finals of a UEFA competition.

The team was drawn against Dynamo Moscow in the semi-finals of the 1971-72 European Cup Winners' Cup. The first leg ended 1–1 in front of 30,000 spectators at Friedrich-Ludwig-Jahn-Sportpark on 5 April 1972. Norbert Johannsen scored the only goal for BFC Dynamo in the match on a penalty. The return leg was played att the Druzhba Stadium in Lviv on 20 April 1972. Wolf-Rüdriger Netz scored 0-1 for BFC Dynamo in the 37th minute, but Gennady Yevryuzhikhin equalized for Dynamo Moscow in the 58th minute. BFC Dynamo was eventually eliminated after a penalty shoot-out. BFC Dynamo finished 1971-72 DDR-Oberliga in second place. It was the club's best season so far in the DDR-Oberliga. Norbert Johannsen became the best goalscorer for BFC Dynamo in the league with 10 goals. BFC Dynamo participated in the Fuwo-Pokal at the end of the league season. The FuWo-Pokal was a tournament for all teams in 1971-72 DDR-Oberliga, sponsored by the East German football weekly Die Neue Fußballwoche (FuWo). BFC Dynamo finished as runners-up after losing 2–0 to FC Karl-Marx-Stadt in the final in front of 12,000 spectators at the Dr.-Kurt-Fischer-Stadion on 17 June 1972. Team captain Joachim Hall retired after the season and Peter Lyszcan was transferred to SG Dynamo Fürstenwalde.

Difficulties and reformation (1972–1975)
Peter Rohde became the new team captain for the 1972–73 season. BFC Dynamo defeated FC Karl-Marx-Stadt 5–2 in the opening match of the 1972-73 DDR-Oberliga in front of 8,000 spectators at Dynamo-Stadion im Sportforum on 16 September 1972.
BFC Dynamo was qualified for the 1972-73 UEFA Cup as the runners-up in the 1971-72 DDR Oberliga. The team defeated Angers SCO in the first round of the competition. BFC Dynamo lost the derby against 1. FC Union Berlin 1–2 in the third matchday in front of 15,000 spectators at the Dynamo-Stadion im Sportforum on 30 September. BFC Dynamo came back with a big 4–0 win against F.C. Hansa Rostock in the fifth matchday in front of 9,000 spectators at the Dynano-Stadion im Sportforum on 15 October 1972. However, the team was then defeated 3–1 away by FC Carl Zeiss Jena in the following matchday. BFC Dynamo defeated Levski Sofia in the second round of the 1972-73 UEFA Cup. The team was drawn against Liverpool F.C. in the third round. BFC Dynamo managed a 0–0 draw against Liverpool F.C. in the first leg in front of 20,000 spectators at the Dynamo-Stadion im Sportforum on 29 November 1972. However, the team was eventually eliminated after a 3–1 loss away in the return leg at Anfield on 13 December 1972. Liverpool F.C would later go on to win the tournament. Wolf-Rüdiger Netz scored the only goal for BFC Dynamo in the match. The goal for the 1972-73 DDR-Oberliga was a medal position. But the team lost important ground to the constant competition from FC Carl Zeiss Jena and SG Dynamo Dresden at the end of the first half of the season. BFC Dynamo only managed a 1–1 draw at home against BSG Sachsenring Zwickau in the 12th matchday and was then defeated 1–0 away by BSG Wismut Aue i the 13th matchday. The team stood at fourth place in the league before the winter break. Werner Lihsa was selected as the 1972 BFC Footballer of the Year for the second year in a row at the seventh edition of the club's traditional annual ball in Dynamo-Sporthalle at the beginning of the new year. Günter Schröter took over as coach for the second half of the 1972–73 season, due to serious illness of coach Geitel.

BFC Dynamo played a friendly match against Swedish side Hammarby IF during the winter break. The team won the match 6–2 at the Dynamo-Stadion im Sportforum on 3 March 1973.  BFC Dynamo reached the semi-finals of the 1972-73 FDGB-Pokal. The team was eliminated in the two-legged semi-final by 1. FC Lokomotive Leipzig. BFC Dynamo met 1. FC Union Berlin in the 16th matchday on 16 April 1972. The team won the return match 0–2 away in front of 18,000 spectators at the Stadion an der Alten Försterei. Both goals were scored by Norbert Johannsen. However, the results in the league declined during the spring. BFC Dynamo lost 2–0 away to 1. FC Magdeburg in the 20th matchday, 2–4 at home to SG Dynamo Dresden in the 21st matchday and then 4–1 away against FC Vorwärts Frankfurt in the 22nd matchday.  BFC Dynamo also lost 2–0 away to BSG Sachsenring Zwickau in the 25th matchday on 9 June 1973. The 17-year-old talented forward Hans-Jürgen Riediger from the youth department made his debut for BFC Dynamo in the DDR-Oberliga as a substitute for Werner Voigt in the match BSG Sachsenring Zwickau. The team then met BSG Wismut Aue at home in the last matchday of the league season 23 June 1973. Riediger was now listed in the starting lineup. BFC Dynamo won the match 3–1, after two goals by Riediger. BFC Dynamo eventually finished 1972-73 DDR-Oberliga in sixth place. Norbert Johannsen became the best goalscorer for BFC Dynamo in the league for the second season in a row. Wolf-Rudiger Netz was transferred to SG Dynamo Schwerin and Manfred Becker to SG Dynamo Fürstenwalde. 

Harry Nippert was the new coach for the 1973–74 season. Günter Schröter became assistant coach. Nippert had previously served as coach at SG Dynamo Adlershof from 1967 to 1969 and then as 
assistant to famous SG Dynamo Dresden coach Walter Fritzsch from from 1969 to 1973. Nippert had also played for SC Dynamo Berlin from 1958 to 1959 and then for SG Dynamo Hohenschönhausen from 1960 to 1962. BFC Dynamo recruited experienced attacking midfielder and national team player Reinhard Lauck from 1. FC Union Berlin for the season.  1. FC Union Berlin had been relegated to the second tier DDR-Liga after the 1972–73 season. Lauck had allegedly been advised by the DFV to switch to BFC Dynamo in order to continue playing for the East Germany national football team. In return for Lauck, Werner Voigt and Bernd Kempke, as well as Michael Jakob from SG Dynamo Fürstenwalde, were transferred to 1. FC Union Berlin. BFC Dynamo started 1973-74 DDR-Oberliga with both clear wins and clear losses. The team defeated BSG Chemie Leipzig 3–0 home in the opening matchday, lost 5–0 away to F.C. Hansa Rostock inte second matchday, defeated FC Rot-Weiß Erfurt 3–0 in the third matchday and then lost 3–0 to BSG Sachsenring Zwickau in the fourth matchday. BFC Dynamo met 1. FC Magdeburg in the quarter-finals of the 1973-74 FDGB-Pokal. The team defeated 1. FC Magdeburg 0-2 and then 2–0 in the two-legged quarterfinal. BFC Dynamo was in 10th place in the league before the winter break. The few wins during the first half of the season had only been achieved against relegation candidates. In between, there were numerous disappointing results. However, there had also been several experiments with tactics and players positions during the autumn. Frank Terletzki was voted the 1973 BFC Footballer of the Year during the club's traditional annual ball in the Dynamo-Sporthalle at the beginning of the new year.

BFC Dynamo was drawn against SG Dynamo Dresden in the semi-finals of the 1973-74 FDGB-Pokal. The team won the first leg 1–0 in front of 21,000 spectators at Friedrich-Ludwig-Jahn-Sportpark on 30 January 1974. The winning goal was scored by Norbert Johannsen. However, BFC Dynamo was eventually eliminated after a 2–0 loss away to SG Dynamo Dresden in the return leg in front of 34,000 spectators at Dynamo-Stadion in Dresden on 13 February 1974. The team got a rematch against SG Dynamo Dresden in the 22nd matchday on the 16th March 1974. BFC Dynamo won the match 3–0 in front of 8,000 spectators at Dynamo-Stadion im Sportforum. The match against SG Dynamo Dresden in the 22nd matchday was the best performance of BFC Dynamo so far during the season. Norbert Johannsen scored two goals and Jochen Carow scored one goal in the match. BFC Dynamo finished also the 1973-74 DDR-Oberliga in sixth place. Numerous players were tried during the season. Not a single player played all 26 league matches during the season. Ralf Schulenberg was transferred to the reserve team BFC Dynamo II after the season. Dieter Stumpf retired from his playing career after the season. He had been registered in the squad, but did not play any matches for the first team during the season.

Martin Skaba became the new assistant coach for the 1974–75 season. BFC Dynamo recruited defender Michael Noack from BSG Energie Cottbus for the season. BSG Energie Cottbus had been relegated to the second tier DDR-Liga after the 1973–74 season. The team was also joined by young defender Lutz Eigendorf from the youth department. Hans-Jürgen Riediger was now also a regular player in the team. BFC Dynamo got off to a shaky start in the 1974-75 DDR-Oberliga. The team had not captured a single win during the first eight matches and was second to last in the league after the eighth matchday. The turning point came with a 3–1 win over 1. FC Lokomotive Leipzig in the ninth matchday on 19 October 1974. Forwards Ralf Schulenberg and Wolf-Rüdiger Netz returned during the autumn. Both had previously been suspended from the DDR-Oberliga for disciplinary reasons. The 17-year-old defender Norbert Trieloff from the youth department made his debut for BFC Dynamo in the DDR-Oberliga against BSG Wismut Aue in the 11th matchday on 30 November 1974. The team won the match 6–0 in front of 5,500 spectators at Dynamo-Stadion im Sportforum. Norbert Johannsen scored three goals, Hans-Jürgen Riediger two goals and Wolf-Rüdiger Netz one goal in the match. Hans-Gustav Creydt became first-choice goalkeeper at the end of the autumn. BFC Dynamo was in sixth place in the league after the first half of the season. Team captain Reinhard Lauck was voted 1974 BFC Footballer of the Year at the clubs's traditional annual ball in the Dynamo-Sporthalle at the beginning of the new year.

The second half of the season started with a slump in the league. BFC Dynamo lost 3–2 away to FC Carl Zeiss Jena in the 15th matchday and stood at 9th place in the leaue. The team then played a 1–1 draw against first-placed 1. FC Magdeburg in the following match day in front of 19,000 spectators at the Dynamo-Stadion im Sportforum on 8 March 1975. A climb in the league began. The team eventually captured the fifth place in the league, after defeating BSG Sachsenring Zwichau 1–0 at home on the 18th matchday. The winning goal was scored by Frank Terletzki. BFC Dynamo then played a 1–1 draw against SG Dynamo Dresden on the 19th matchday in front of 21,000 spectators at Friedrich-Ludwig-Jahn-Sportpark on 25 April 1975. The fourth place in the league was then captured with a 2–0 win over FC Rot-Weiß Erfurt in the 21st matchday. BFC Dynamo then defeated HFC Chemie 8–0 on the 23rd matchday on 14 May 1975. HFC Chemie was previously the team that had achieved the biggest win of the season after defeating BSG Stahl Riesa 7–1 in the fourth matchday. BFC Dynamo finished 1974-75 DDR-Oberliga in fourth place. Norbert Johannsen became the best goalscorer for BFC Dynamo in the league. Werner Lihsa and Jochen Carow retired after the season.

Rise in the DDR-Oberliga (1975–1978)

Frank Terletzki became the new team captain for the 1975–76 season. The team was joined by the young goalkeeper Reinhard Schwerdtner from the youth department. Schwerdtner would be played together with Hans-Gustav Creydt during the season. Wolf-Rüdiger Netz, Michael Noack, Reinhard Lauck, Ralf Schulenberg, Bernard Jonelat, Hans-Jürgen Riediger, Frank Terletzki and Lutz Eigendorf were key-players on the team. The young midfielder Roland Jüngling from the youth department would also join the team and make regular appearances in DDR-Oberliga during the season. Jüngling had made his debut BFC Dynamo in the DDR-Oberliga during the previous season.  BFC Dynamo had the youngest team in the league with an average age of only 22.5 years at the start of season. BFC Dynamo moved its home matches permanently to the Friedrich-Ludwig-Jahn-Sportpark at the start of the 1975–76 season. BFC Dynamo started the 1975-76 DDR-Oberliga with good results. The team defeated FC Vorwärts Frankfut 7–1 in the opening match in front of 10,000 spectators at the Friedrich-Ludwig-Jahn-Sportpark on 23 August 1975. The team then defeated BSG Energie Cottbus 5–1 in the second matchday in front of 22,000 spectators at the Friedrich-Ludwig-Jahn-Sportpark on 27 August 1975. The two big wins were followed by a 5–1 loss away against SG Dynamo Dresden in the third matchday on 30 August 1975. BFC Dynamo met 1. FC Magdeburg in the round of 16 in 1975-76 FDGB-Pokal. The team won the first leg 3–1 in front of 13,000 spectators at the Friedrich-Ludwig-Jahn-Sportpark on 7 December 1975. Reinhard Lauck scored two goals. However, the team was eliminated after a 0–4 loss in the return leg on 17 December 1975. BFC Dynamo defeated BSG Sachsenring Zwickau 0–5 away in the last matchday before the winter break. Hans-Jürgen Riediger scored two goals, Wolf-Rüdiger Netz two goals and Frank Terletzki one goal in the match. BFC Dynamo was in fifth place in the league after the first half of the season.

The 1975-76 DDR-Oberliga was dominated by SG Dynamo Dresden. BFC Dynamo met SG Dynamo Dresden at home in the 16th matchday on 21 February 1976. The match was played in front of 25,000 spectators at Friedrich-Ludwig-Jahn-Sportpark. BFC Dynamo came back from 0-2 and Riediger made it 3–2 in the 66th minute. The score was 3–3 at the end of the match with Creydt saving a penalty from Hans-Jürgen Kreische. SG Dynamo Dresden eventually won the match 3-4 after a goal by Dieter Riedel in the 90th minute. However, BFC Dynamo would recorded several big wins and spectator numbers at the Friedrich-Ludwig-Jahn-Sportpark during the spring. BFC Dynamo defeated 1. FC Magdeburg 4–0 in the 18th matchday in front of 22,000 spectators at the Friedrich-Ludwig-Jahn-Sportpark on 6 March 1976  The team then defeated FC-Karl-Marx Stadt 4–0 in the 20th matchday in front of 12,000 spectators at Friedrich-Ludwig-Jahn-Sportpark on 27 March 1976. Hans-Jürgen Riediger scored a hat trick in the match. BFC Dynamo defeated FC Carl Zeiss Jena 3–0 in the 22nd matchday in front of 23,000 spectators at Friedrich-Ludwig-Jahn-Sportpark on 17 April 1976 and then 1. FC Lokomotive Leipzig 6–0 on the 24th matchday in front of 25,000 spectators at Friedrich-Ludwig-Jahn-Sportpark on 8 May 1976. BFC Dynamo finished the 1975-76 DDR-Oberliga as runners-up. The young team under coach Nippert had achieved a goal difference of 67-26 during the 26 matches of league season. Riediger scored 18 goals, Netz 12 goals and Terletzki 10 goals for BFC Dynamo in the league. Norbert Johannsen retired from his playing career after the season.

BFC Dynamo recruited young midfielder Rainer Troppa from BSG Energie Cottbus for the 1976–77 season. BSG Energie Cottbus had been relegated to the DDR-Liga after the 1975–76 season. The only players from the team that had played against Dynamo Moscow in the semi-finals of the 1971-72 European Cup Winners' Cup that remained were Harald Schütze, Peter Rohde, Ralf Schulenberg, Frank Terletzki and Wolf-Rüdiger Netz. More young players from the youth department would also make their debut with the first team during the 1976–77 season. Local rival 1. Union Berlin was back in the DDR-Oberliga in the 1976–77 season after three seasons in the DDR-Liga. BFC Dynamo met 1. FC Union Berlin in the opening match of the 1976-77 DDR-Oberliga. 1. Union Berlin had become the focus of hooligan attention. All matches in the derby would now be played at the large Stadion der Weltjugend in Mitte for security reasons. BFC Dynamo was defeated 1-0 by 1. FC Union Berlin in front of 45,000 spectators at the Stadion der Weltjugend. The derby was attended by several high-ranking politicians such as Erich Honecker, Erich Mielke, Harry Tisch and Egon Krenz. BFC Dynamo was qualified for the 1976-77 UEFA Cup. The team was eliminated by FC Shakhtar Donetsk in the first round. Young goalkeeper Bodo Rudwaleit from the youth department made his debut for BFC Dynamo in the DDR-Oberliga in the eighth matchday against FC Carl-Zeiss Jena on 22 October 1976. BFC Dynamo was drawn against SG Dynamo Dresden in the Round of 16 of the 1976-77 FDGB Pokal. BFC Dynamo lost the first leg 1–4 away on 20 November 1976. Young forward Ralf Sträßer from the youth department made his debut for the first team of BFC Dynamo in the match, as a substitute for Rainer Wroblewski in the 70th minute. Sträßer then score the only goal for BFC Dynamo in the match. The return leg was played at the Friedrich-Ludwig-Jahn-Sportpark on 27 November 1976. BFC Dynamo won the match 3–1, but was eliminated on goal difference. Sträßer then made his debut for BFC Dynamo in the DDR-Oberliga at home against FC Vorwärts Frankfurt in the 11th matchday on 2 December 1976. He would henceforth be used as a regular player during the season. BFC Dynamo defeated SG Dynamo Dresden 2–1 in the 13th matchday in front of 16,000 spectators at Friedrich-Ludwig-Jahn-Sportpark on 18 December 1976. Wolf-Rüdiger Netz and Dietmar Labes scored one goal each. BFC Dynamo was in third place after the first half of the season. Ralf Schulenberg retired from his playing career for medical reasons after the first half of the season, at only 27-years-old. Reinhard Lauck was voted the 1976 BFC Footballer of the Year at the 11th edition of the club's traditional annual ball in Dynamo-Sporthalle at the beginning of the new year. BFC Dynamo also lost the return match against 1. FC Union Berlin 0–1 on the 14th matchday on 19 February 1977. However, it would come to be the last defeat to 1. FC Union Berlin in the DDR-Oberliga. BFC Dynamo defeatd F.C. Hansa Rostock 6–0 in the 16th matchday in front of 9,500 spectators at the Friedrich-Ludwig-Jahn-Sportpark on 26 February 1977. Wolf-Rüdriger Netz scored a legendary hat-trick in the match, with three goals in the 63rd, 64th and 66th match minutes. BFC Dynamo finished the 1976-77 DDR-Oberliga in fourth place. Harald Schütze retired after the season.

Jürgen Bogs became new coach on 1 July 1977. The 30-year-old Bogs had a background as a youth coach in the youth academy of BFC Dynamo and had led the BFC Dynamo junior team to a second place in the 1974–75 and 1975-76 East German Junior championships (de). Martin Skaba continued as assistant coach. BFC Dynamo recruited striker Hartmut Pelka from BSG Chemie Leipzig and the 17-year-old striker Detlef Helms from 1. FC Union Berlin for the 1977–78 season. Norbert Trieloff had also established himself in the libero-position and was now regular player in the team. BFC Dynamo lost 1–4 at home to 1. FC Lokomotive Lepzig in the second matchday of the 1977-78 DDR-Oberliga on 20 August 1977. The team then defeated local rival 1. FC Union Berlin 1–0 in the third matchday in front of 45,000 spectators at the Stadion Der Weltjugend on 26 August 1977. Frank Terletzki scored the winning goal for BFC Dynamo on a free kick in the 87th minute. Young goalkeeper Bodo Rudwaleit would be the first-choice goalkeeper from the fifth matchday. BFC Dynamo was drawn against 1. FC Lokomotive Leipzig in the Round of 16 of the 1977-78 FDGB-Pokal. BFC Dynamo won the first leg 5–0 at home  on 26 November 1977. The team also won the return leg and advanced to the quarter-finals. The team defeated first-placed SG Dynamo Dresden 1–2 away in the 12th matchday 3 December 1977. The team had establish itself in third place at the end of the first half of the season. BFC Dynamo reached the semi-finals of the 1977-78 FDGB-Pokal. The team was eliminated in the two-legged semi-final by 1. FC Magdeburg. 1. FC Magdeburg, with star player Joachim Streich, would later go on to win the cup. Young defender Artur Ullrich from the reserve team made his debut for BFC Dynamo in the DDR-Oberliga at home against BSG Wismut Gera on the 19th matchday on 7 April 1978. Ullrich had come through the youth department. BFC Dynamo won the match 4-0 after three goals by Hans-Jürgen Riediger and one goal by Ralf Sträßer. BFC Dynamo eventually finished 1977-78 DDR-Oberliga in third place. Wolf-Rüdiger Netz became the best goalscorer for BFC Dynamo in the league with 13 goals. Goalkeeper Hans-Gustav Creydt retired from is playing career after the season.

See also
 History of Berliner FC Dynamo (1978–1989)
 History of Berliner FC Dynamo (1989–2004)
 History of Berliner FC Dynamo (2004–present)

Explanatory notes

References

Berliner FC Dynamo
History of association football by club
History of football in Germany